The Purple Plain is a 1954 British war film directed by Robert Parrish, with Gregory Peck playing a Royal Canadian Air Force pilot serving in the Royal Air Force in the Burma campaign in the closing months of the Second World War, who is battling with depression after having lost his wife to German bombing in London. The cast also included Win Min Than, Maurice Denham and Lyndon Brook. The film was shot at Pinewood Studios and on location in Ceylon. The film's sets were designed by the art director Jack Maxsted. It was nominated for two BAFTA awards. The film was based on the 1947 novel of the same name by H. E. Bates.

Plot
Bill Forrester (Gregory Peck), a RCAF pilot serving in the Royal Air Force in Burma, pilots a de Havilland Mosquito, a two-seat fighter-bomber. Forrester is emotionally distraught after losing his new wife in the Blitz in London and has become self destructive, seeking to end his life in action. His reckless conduct in action raises the concern of his commanding officer, because it needlessly endangers his flight crews, and others also become reluctant to fly with Forrester. The commander seeks to have him grounded. However it would require the approval of the base flight surgeon. The doctor agrees reluctantly to examine him, despite the fact that Forrester is highly decorated and the best pilot in the squadron. He seeks out Forrester and upon finding him, convinces him to visit a village where he is introduced to beautiful Burmese woman named Anna. They strike up a friendship and continue to see each other. During one of their conversations, he tells Anna about the loss of his past wife and his desire to end his own life by dying in action; "You'd think that would be easy in a war", he explains to Anna, "but I just kept getting medals instead." Anna and he begin to fall in love and with Anna's support, Bill begins to recover his emotional stability.

Forrester is allowed to return to the air by flying a ferry mission. He and his new navigator Carrington (Lyndon Brook) are assigned to fly a routine non-combat flight to Meiktila. Their passenger is Flight Lieutenant Blore (Maurice Denham) who is riding in the Mosquito's bomb bay--"strap-hanging." During the flight an engine fire forces them down in a remote arid area of Burma's central plain, which is controlled by the Japanese. The soil on the arid plain and the surrounding hills have a purple hue, thus the name of the film.

Carrington is injured during the crash landing. His leg is badly burned and he is unable to walk. Without supplies and very little water, Forrester decides their best chance for survival is to walk 30 miles to the nearest river, where they can get the much needed water. From there they would stand a better chance for rescue. Blore on the other hand, believes their best chance is to stay with the plane and wait for rescue, as search parties would surely be looking for them. Blore's hope is bolstered by sighting an airplane flying high overhead, on the same route they were on before the crash. Forrester points out that being spotted from such a great altitude is one in a million. Blore is convinced and decides to go with Forrester's plan. They build a stretcher for Carrington out of bamboo and set out for the river by walking at night and resting during the day. As the three men struggle to survive in the hostile environment, the self-destructive Forrester proves to be the one with the strongest will to live. His goal becomes the survival of the other two and seeing Anna again.

During the trek, Blore, while carrying the stretcher from the front, slips and falls down a rocky slope. In the fall he breaks his collar bone and is badly skinned up. Unable to continue carrying the stretcher, and with the meagre water supply dwindling, Forrester alters their plan. Blore must continue on to the river while Forrester stays with Carrington. Once there he can bring back water for the both of them. Blore once again objects and wants for all of them to return to the airplane. Forrester tells him to sleep on the suggestion and they can decide once they get some rest.

Upon waking, Forrester discovers that Blore has gone, but he has left a canteen with some water in it. Forrester tells Carrington that he will go bring Blore back and leaves the canteen with him. He sets out to rescue Blore once again and without water, only to hear the gunshot of Blore committing suicide before he can catch up with him. Upon reaching him, he takes Blore's dog tags and the pistol. He also finds Blore's wallet with a picture of his family in it, a wife and two children. The irony of the moment is striking in that Blore, the one person that claimed to have the most to live for with a family and a profession back home, ended up being the one to lose all hope so quickly. Forrester gathers up his belongings and returns to Carrington.

The two once again set out for the river, this time with Forrester carrying Carrington on his back. With very little water left and still many miles to go, Forrester is unable to walk any further and they collapse with exhaustion to the desert floor. Carrington convinces him that their only hope now is to take whatever water is left, and when Forrester reaches the river, to fill the canteen and bring it back. Forrester reluctantly agrees.

Now alone and near complete exhaustion, Forrester struggles on through seemingly endless miles of scrub brush and parched arid plain. Near his limit of endurance he struggles up a hill and falls face down, unable to go any further. Upon finding some lost reserve of strength, he opens his eyes and hears the sound of water. He struggles over the crest of the hill and on the other side is a miracle. It is the river.

The next scene is that of the people back at his home base hearing the news of their survival. Forrester has indeed returned with the water to Carrington, and now the two are headed back on a transport airplane. Upon landing Forrester says goodbye to Carrington who must stay on the plane which will take him to a hospital. Forrester, still weak from the ordeal, is greeted by the base doctor who upon giving him a quick examination, agrees to deliver him by jeep back to the waiting Anna. The final scene is that of Forrester finding Anna asleep in her bed. He lies down beside her without waking her up and falls promptly asleep.

Cast
 Gregory Peck as Squadron Leader Bill Forrester
 Win Min Than as Anna
 Maurice Denham as Flight Lieutenant Blore
 Lyndon Brook as Flying Officer Carrington (navigator)
 Brenda De Banzie as Miss McNab
 Bernard Lee as Dr. Harris
 Anthony Bushell as Wing Commander Aldridge
 Josephine Griffin as Mrs. Forrester
 Ram Gopal as Mr. Phang
 Dorothy Alison as Nurse
 Peter Arne as Flight Lieutenant
 Jack McNaughton as Sergeant Brown
 Lane Meddick as Radio operator
 Harold Siddons as Navigator Williams
 John A. Tinn as Burmese jeweler

Production

The Purple Plain is regarded generally as historically accurate with good production values and attention to detail, and depicts the native Burmese in a respectful manner. The film is based on the 1947 novel The Purple Plain by H. E. Bates who was commissioned into the RAF during World War II. It was one of three novels he wrote after his travels to Burma and India in 1945, on military assignment to write short pieces portraying the Burmese war for American readers. The novel was first serialised in the Saturday Evening Post in September and October 1947. The film script was written by novelist Eric Ambler in consultation with Bates.

The film was produced with a relatively modest budget by Two Cities Films and was directed by the American director Robert Parrish. The film was shot in Sigiriya, in what was then Ceylon (now Sri Lanka), and utilised several locations later used in The Bridge on the River Kwai. The aircraft in the film were repainted in accurate SEAC camouflage and markings, and were provided through the co-operation of the Royal Air Force, which also provided several staff on-site during the filming. Some of these are credited as extras.

Cinematographer Geoffrey Unsworth filmed the production at a time when the British film industry was changing over from 3-strip Technicolor to Eastmancolor. The Purple Plain is considered a ‘hybrid’ film as the location filming in Ceylon was in Eastmancolor whilst the interiors at Pinewood Studios were in 3-strip Technicolor. Another known ‘hybrid’ film of this period was To Paris with Love.

Casting
Gregory Peck had not done a film in Hollywood for approximately four years, preferring the tax incentives of working outside the United States.

The original choice for Anna was June Rose, a Burmese royal princess of Australian descent and the great-granddaughter of Prince Kanaung. She pulled out during the shooting in Ceylon saying "It was so Hollywood, it was ridiculous; it was an insult to anything that had to do with Burma", adding "When the film did come to Burma there was a big hue and cry. Things in the pagoda, things a Buddhist would never do."

She was replaced by Win Min Than who was born Helga Johnston, the wife of Burmese politician and businessman Bo Setkya (1916–1969; aka Thakin Aung Than, Bo Set Kya or Set-kya), in her only film role. Her father was Australian and her mother Burmese.  In 1964 she shaved her head and became a Buddhist nun in Rangoon, adopting the name Daw Wanthalamar. Her husband had fled the country, went underground, and had not been heard of since General Ne Win had taken over the country in March 1962. She left the convent a year later and went into business selling gourds. Both Bo Set Kya and Ne Win were members of the Thirty Comrades.

Reception
The Purple Plain opened to solid reviews with Variety labeling it a "fine dramatic vehicle" that "vividly establishes the atmosphere,"

Box office
The Purple Plain was successful at the box office, being the 11th most popular film in Britain in 1954. According to Kinematograph Weekly the film was a "money maker" at the British box office in 1954.

According to Variety it earned $1,300,000 in rentals in the US. However it was considered a commercial disappointment in the US.

Awards
It was ultimately nominated in the category of Best British film of 1954 at the 8th British Academy Film Awards, while actor Maurice Denham was nominated for the award for Best Actor in a Leading Role for his performance as Blore.

References

Bibliography
 Bates, H. E. The Purple Plain. London: Michael Joseph, 1947. .
  Yawnghwe, Chao Tzang. The Shan of Burma: Memoirs of a Shan Exile. Singapore: Institute of Southeast Asian Studies, 2010. .

External links
 
 H.E. Bates Companion: The Purple Plain
The Purple Plain at HEBates.com

1954 films
1950s war adventure films
British war adventure films
British aviation films
Films shot at Pinewood Studios
Films about shot-down aviators
Works by H. E. Bates
Films set in Myanmar
Films shot in Sri Lanka
Films based on British novels
Films directed by Robert Parrish
Burma Campaign films
American World War II films
British World War II films
1950s English-language films
1950s American films
1950s British films